Alexey Nikolayevich Kamnev (born 16 August 1979 in Leningrad, RSFSR, USSR) is a Russian curler.

At the national level he is a four-time Russian men's champion curler (2005, 2006, 2008, 2011), 2013 Russian mixed doubles champion curler and 2008 Russian mixed champion curler.

Awards
 Russian Men's Curling Championship: gold (2005, 2006, 2008, 2011), silver (2012).
 Russian Mixed Curling Championship: gold (2008), silver (2011).
 Russian Mixed Doubles Curling Championship: gold (2013), bronze (2012).
 Master of Sports of Russia, International Class (curling).

Teams

Men's

Mixed

Mixed doubles

References

External links

Living people
1979 births
Curlers from Saint Petersburg
Russian male curlers
Russian curling champions